Bahrami-ye Olya (also Romanized as Bahrāmī-ye ‘Olyā; also known as Bahrāmī, Bahrami Sardoo’iyeh, Bahrāmī-ye Bālā, and Bahrāmī-ye Sārdū’īyeh) is a village in Eslamabad Rural District, in the Central District of Jiroft County, Kerman Province, Iran. At the 2006 census, its population was 254, in 55 families.

References 

Populated places in Jiroft County